HSwMS Östergötland (Ögd), is a submarine of the Swedish Navy named after Östergötland, Sweden.

Development 

Submarines of the Västergötland class had greater submarine hunting capacity than previous classes, partly due to the fact that they were equipped with a new modern submarine  torpedo. The submarines of the Västergötland class were able to fire up to six heavy and six light wire-guided torpedoes at the same time against different targets.

The Västergötland class included the submarines  and Östergötland. After significant upgrades, these two submarines were reclassified to a new .

Service history
Between 2000 and 2004, Östergötland and Södermanland underwent extensive modifications, were extended by 12 meters and fitted with air-independent Stirling engines. At the same time, the submarines would be modified to handle international missions with operations in hot and salty waters. The conversion of the two submarines became so extensive that Kockums decided to reclassify the submarines to a new Södermanland class.

Östergötland was decommissioned in 2021.

References 

Västergötland-class submarines
Ships built in Malmö
1988 ships